David Edwards (born 13 September 1979 in Dumfries, Scotland) is a Scottish male curler.

Teams

Men's

Mixed

Private life
He attended the University of Aberdeen.

References

External links
 
 Team Edwards

Living people
1979 births
Sportspeople from Dumfries
Scottish male curlers
European curling champions
Scottish curling champions
Alumni of the University of Aberdeen